Viana is a town and municipality located in the province and  autonomous community of Navarre, northern Spain.  Cesare Borgia is buried there.

Viana is on the French Way path of the Camino de Santiago.

Demography

Notable people
 José Antonio Lacayo de Briones y Palacios, born there in 1679, was Governor of Costa Rica (1713 to 1717) and Nicaragua (1740 to 1745) during Spanish colonial times.
 Francisco Gonzalez de Ibarra, a missionary active in Southern California between 1820 and 1840, was a native of Viana, born there in 1782.
 Jesús Elizalde Sainz de Robles (1907-1980), Carlist politician

See also
Prince of Viana

References

External links
 

 Viana.- Medieval History of Navarre
Ciudad de Viana (City of Viana) translated to english

Municipalities in Navarre